Sedgwick is a city in Harvey and Sedgwick counties in the State of Kansas.  As of the 2020 census, the population of the city was 1,603.

History
For millennia, the land now known as Kansas was inhabited by Native Americans.  In 1803, most of modern Kansas was secured by the United States as part of the Louisiana Purchase.  In 1854, the Kansas Territory was organized, then in 1861 Kansas became the 34th U.S. state.  In 1867, Sedgwick County was founded.  In 1872, Harvey County was founded.

Sedgwick was laid out on an  town site in 1870. It was named for John Sedgwick, a major general in the Union Army during the American Civil War. Sedgwick was incorporated as a city in 1872.

Geography
Sedgwick is located at coordinates 37.9166784, -97.4225410 in the state of Kansas.

Climate
The climate in this area is characterized by hot, humid summers and generally mild to cool winters.  According to the Köppen Climate Classification system, Sedgwick has a humid subtropical climate, abbreviated "Cfa" on climate maps.

Demographics

2010 census
As of the census of 2010, there were 1,695 people, 611 households, and 440 families living in the city. The racial makeup of the city was 95.8% White, 0.2% African American, 0.5% Native American, 0.3% Asian, 1.5% from other races, and 1.7% from two or more races. Hispanic or Latino of any race were 4.4% of the population.

There were 611 households, of which 40.6% had children under the age of 18 living with them, 56.1% were married couples living together, 10.5% had a female householder with no husband present, 5.4% had a male householder with no wife present, and 28.0% were non-families. 24.5% of all households were made up of individuals, and 9.4% had someone living alone who was 65 years of age or older. The average household size was 2.68 and the average family size was 3.21.

The median age in the city was 37 years. 29.6% of residents were under the age of 18; 6.5% were between the ages of 18 and 24; 24.6% were from 25 to 44; 24.3% were from 45 to 64; and 14.9% were 65 years of age or older. The gender makeup of the city was 48.0% male and 52.0% female.

2000 census

As of the census of 2000, there were 1,537 people, 545 households, and 424 families living in the city. The racial makeup of the city was 95.71% White, 0.07% African American, 1.56% Native American, 0.26% Asian, 0.78% from other races, and 1.63% from two or more races. Hispanic or Latino of any race were 3.12% of the population.

There were 545 households, out of which 40.9% had children under the age of 18 living with them, 65.5% were married couples living together, 8.3% had a female householder with no husband present, and 22.2% were non-families. 20.9% of all households were made up of individuals, and 9.2% had someone living alone who was 65 years of age or older. The average household size was 2.71 and the average family size was 3.15.

In the city, the population was spread out, with 29.6% under the age of 18, 6.4% from 18 to 24, 30.7% from 25 to 44, 19.5% from 45 to 64, and 13.8% who were 65 years of age or older. The median age was 35 years. For every 100 females, there were 93.6 males. For every 100 females age 18 and over, there were 92.9 males.

As of 2000 the median income for a household in the city was $44,934, and the median income for a family was $49,659. Males had a median income of $37,216 versus $24,732 for females. The per capita income for the city was $17,009. About 4.4% of families and 6.2% of the population were below the poverty line, including 11.7% of those under age 18 and 5.9% of those age 65 or over.

Education
The community is served by Sedgwick USD 439 public school district.

Notable people

 Bryce Douvier (born 1991), professional basketball player. 
 Allen Kanavel (1874–1938), surgeon, professor of surgery and he established the Department of Neurological Surgery at Northwestern University School of Medicine.
 Harold Manning (1909–2003), long-distance runner, he represented the United States in the steeplechase at the 1936 Summer Olympics.
 Brian Moorman (born 1976), punter in the NFL for the Buffalo Bills.

See also
 National Register of Historic Places listings in Harvey County, Kansas
 Arkansas Valley Interurban Railway

References

Further reading

External links

 
 Sedgwick - Directory of Public Officials, League of Kansas Municipalities
 Historic Images of Sedgwick, Special Photo Collections at Wichita State University Library
 Sedgwick City Map, KDOT
 Harvey County Maps: Current, Historic, KDOT
 Sedgwick County Maps: Current, Historic, KDOT

Cities in Kansas
Cities in Harvey County, Kansas
Cities in Sedgwick County, Kansas
Wichita, KS Metropolitan Statistical Area